Kunz (Konrad also Conrad or Conrath) Lochner (1510 in Nuremberg – buried 19 August 1567) was an eminent master plate armourer, blacksmith and silversmith from Nuremberg, Germany, Holy Roman Empire. He was the son of a skillful armourer with the same name (d. 1527), and his two brothers Heinrich and Hans who were also skillful armourers and blacksmiths. In 1543, Lochner started working for the Holy Roman Emperor Ferdinand I, and the following year he began his service at the future Maximilian II as court armourer. Lochner's workshop produced some of the most magnificent plate armours made during the 16th-century Renaissance period for field warfare, tourney and ceremonial occasions. Lochner's patrons included royalty, knights and nobility from across Europe.

Armour crafted by Lochner, bearing Lochner's personal hallmark: a shield with demi-lion in dexter and bendy of six in sinister; similar is also his other personal hallmark: a shield with lion rampant, or on stylistic grounds bearing the Nuremberg hallmark, can be found preserved in museums such as the Royal Armoury (Livrustkammaren) in Stockholm, the Dresden State Art Collections (Dresden Armoury) in Dresden, the Army Museum in Paris and the Metropolitan Museum of Art in New York City.

Known preserved works

Parade armour for man and horse 

The armour was crafted in 1550 for king Sigismund II Augustus of Poland. He was the last king of the old Jagiellonian dynasty. In his wills he divided his legacy between his sisters. One of them was Catherine Jagiellon, queen of Sweden, married to John III of Sweden. Since Poland didn't have a given heir to the throne, John III wanted his son Sigismund to be the next successor. In the complicated process of choosing a new king, Catherine's sister Anna sent this armour to calm John III concerning the heritage and to ensure herself of support from Sweden. The armour remains of a full plate armour and bard.

Gallery of preserved works

See also
Armor of Ferdinand I, Holy Roman Emperor

References

Further reading

Date of birth unknown
1510 births
1567 deaths
16th-century German businesspeople
Armourers
German blacksmiths
German silversmiths
Businesspeople from Nuremberg